Cristina Ana Cazacu (born ) is a Romanian female volleyball player, playing as a right side hitter. She was part of the Romania women's national volleyball team. 

She competed at the 2011 Women's European Volleyball Championship. On club level she plays for CS Știința Bacău.

Clubs
  2004 Tomis Constanța (2009–2013)
  CSM București (2013–2015)
  CS Știința Bacău (2015–2020)
 CS Medgidia (2020-present)

References

External links
 Profile at CEV
https://web.archive.org/web/20170330135032/http://www.scoresway.com/?sport=volleyball&page=player&id=2454

1994 births
Living people
Romanian women's volleyball players
Place of birth missing (living people)